Simon Roy (14 June 1968 – 15 October 2022) was a Canadian author. He was also a professor of literature at the Collège Lionel-Groulx for more than thirty years.

Biography
Born on 14 June 1968 in Saint-Alexis, Roy married Marianne Marquis-Gravel, with whom he had two children, Romane and Colin. He was known for his 2014 novel Ma vie rouge Kubrick, which received the Prix des libraires du Québec in the category of Québécois novels.

Roy died of brain cancer on 15 October 2022, at the age of 54.

Books
Ma vie rouge Kubrick (2014)
Owen Hopkins, esquire (2016)
Fait par un autre (2021)
Ma fin du monde (2022)

References

1968 births
2022 deaths
21st-century Canadian writers
Writers from Quebec